Franco Zapiola Yamartino (born 19 February 2001) is an Argentine footballer who plays for Estudiantes de La Plata in the Argentine Primera División.

Career
Zapiola is from Magdalena, Buenos Aires and came through the youth system at Estudiantes de La Plata. He made his debut for the Estudiantes first team on 17 July, 2021 against Club Atlético Sarmiento and shortly afterwards signed a professional contract with Estudiantes until December 2023. In October 2022 he extended this contract until the end of 2024 having made over 50 appearances for the club in the league and cups, including his debut in the Copa Libertadores.

References

External links

2001 births
Living people
Argentine footballers
Association football midfielders
Argentine Primera División players
Estudiantes de La Plata footballers
Footballers from Buenos Aires